Euseius macrospatulatus is a species of mite in the family Phytoseiidae.

References

macrospatulatus
Articles created by Qbugbot
Animals described in 1986